Naresh Kamalkar Churi (born 10 May 1964) is an Indian cricket coach and former first-class cricketer who played for Railways.

Life and career
Churi was born on 10 May 1964 in Bombay (now Mumbai). Cricket coach Ramakant Achrekar, who had five daughters, adopted Churi at the age of 13 so that he could watch matches at the Wankhede Stadium.

Churi made his first-class debut for Railways during the 1982–83 Ranji Trophy and represented the team until the 1988–89 season. A left-handed batsman, Churi scored 1501 runs in 26 first-class matches with two hundreds, including a 112 against Tamil Nadu in the final of the 1987–88 Ranji Trophy which Railways lost by an innings. He would then represent Rest of India in the 1988–89 Irani Cup against the same opposition.

Churi became a cricket coach at Shardashram Vidyamandir in Mumbai, his alma mater, in 1999. He continues to work there, as of 2013.

References

External links 
 
 

1964 births
Living people
Indian cricketers
Railways cricketers
Central Zone cricketers
Indian cricket coaches
Cricketers from Mumbai